Fabián Andrés Cuéllar Trujillo (born June 21, 1985) is a Colombian former footballer whose last team was Irapuato of the second tier Ascenso MX in Mexico.
He plays futsal in his homeland.

References
 Profile at BDFA 

1985 births
Living people
Colombian footballers
Colombian expatriate footballers
Deportivo Pereira footballers
Atlético Huila footballers
Monagas S.C. players
Santiago Morning footballers
La Paz F.C. players
Cienciano footballers
Peruvian Primera División players
Expatriate footballers in Chile
Expatriate footballers in Venezuela
Expatriate footballers in Bolivia
Expatriate footballers in Peru
Expatriate footballers in Mexico

Association footballers not categorized by position
People from Huila Department